This is a list of the National Register of Historic Places listings in Hidalgo County, Texas

This is intended to be a complete list of properties and districts listed on the National Register of Historic Places in Hidalgo County, Texas. There are four districts and 19 individual properties listed on the National Register in the county. One property is a State Antiquities Landmark. Eight properties are designated Recorded Texas Historic Landmarks (RTHLs) while two districts and two more individual properties contain RTHLs within their boundaries.

Current listings

The locations of National Register properties and districts may be seen in a mapping service provided.

|}

See also

National Register of Historic Places listings in Texas
Recorded Texas Historic Landmarks in Hidalgo County

References

External links

Registered Historic Places
Hidalgo County
Buildings and structures in Hidalgo County, Texas